The 2004 presidential campaign of John Edwards, U.S. Senator from North Carolina, began on September 16, 2003.

Background and announcement

In 2000, Edwards unofficially began his presidential campaign when he began to seek speaking engagements in Iowa, the site of the nation's first party caucuses. On January 2, 2003, Edwards began fundraising without officially campaigning by forming an exploratory committee. On September 15, 2003, Edwards fulfilled a promise he made a year earlier as a guest on The Daily Show with Jon Stewart to unofficially announce his intention to seek the 2004 Democratic presidential nomination. The next morning, Edwards made the announcement officially from his hometown. He declined to run for reelection to the Senate in order to focus on his presidential run. Edwards' campaign was chaired by North Carolina Democratic activist Ed Turlington.

Campaign timeline

Early campaign
As Edwards had been building support essentially since his election to the Senate, he led the initial campaign fundraising, amassing over $7 million during the first quarter of 2003 – more than half of which came from individuals associated with the legal profession, particularly Edwards' fellow trial lawyers, their families, and employees.

Edwards' "stump speech" spoke of two Americas, with one composed of the wealthy and privileged, and the other of the hard-working common man, causing the media to often characterize Edwards as a populist.

First nominating contests
Edwards struggled to gain substantial support, but his poll numbers began to rise steadily weeks before the Iowa caucuses. Edwards had a surprising second-place finish with the support of 32% of delegates, behind only John Kerry's 39% and ahead of former front-runner Howard Dean at 18%. One week later in the New Hampshire primary, Edwards finished in fourth place behind Kerry, Dean and Wesley Clark, with 12%. During the February 3 primaries, Edwards won the South Carolina primary, lost to Clark in Oklahoma, and lost to Kerry in the other states. Edwards garnered the second largest number of second-place finishes, again falling behind Clark.

Dean withdrew from the contest, leaving Edwards the only major challenger to Kerry. In the Wisconsin primary on February 17, Edwards finished second to Kerry with 34% of the vote.

Super Tuesday 2004
Edwards largely avoided attacking Kerry until a February 29, 2004 debate in New York, where he characterized him as a "Washington insider" and mocked Kerry's plan to form a committee to examine trade agreements.

In the Super Tuesday primaries on March 2, Kerry finished well ahead in nine of the ten states voting, and Edwards' campaign ended. In Georgia, Edwards finished only slightly behind Kerry but, failing to win a single state, chose to withdraw from the race. He announced his official withdrawal at a Raleigh, North Carolina press conference on March 3. Edwards' withdrawal made major media outlets relatively early on the evening of Super Tuesday, at about 6:30 p.m. CST, before polls had closed in California and before caucuses in Minnesota had even begun. It is thought that the withdrawal influenced many people in Minnesota to vote for other candidates, which may partially account for the strong Minnesota finish of Dennis Kucinich. Edwards did win the presidential straw poll conducted by the Independence Party of Minnesota.

Results

Key results:

 The table is meant to show all the contests Edwards competed in and won, not a complete list of primary states. That is to say everything on Super Tuesday and Before as well as North Carolina should be included in the table.

 Edwards won the nominating Contest (North Carolina and South Carolina)
Edwards came in either 2nd or 3rd place in the nominating contest (Iowa, Delaware, Missouri, Oklahoma, Michigan, Tennessee, Virginia, Nevada, Wisconsin, Hawaii, Utah, California, Connecticut, Georgia, Maryland, Massachusetts, Minnesota, New York, Ohio, Rhode Island, Vermont)
 Edwards came in 4th Place or Below in the nominating contest (New Hampshire, Arizona, New Mexico, North Dakota, Washington)

After withdrawal

Surprise North Carolina win
After withdrawing from the race, he went on to win the April 17 Democratic caucuses in his home state of North Carolina, making him the only Democratic candidate besides Kerry to win nominating contests in two states.

Vice-Presidential nomination

On July 6, 2004 Kerry announced that Edwards would be his running mate; the decision was widely hailed in public opinion polls and by Democratic leaders. Though many Democrats supported Edwards' nomination, others criticized the selection for Edwards' perceived lack of experience. The nomination caused the Chamber of Commerce network to throw its support to George W. Bush due to Edwards' opposition to
tort reform. In the vice presidential debate, Dick Cheney incorrectly told Edwards they never met due to Edwards' frequent absences from the Senate. The media later found at least one videotape of Cheney and Edwards meeting.

The Democratic ticket ultimately lost the presidential election and Bush was re-elected. Subsequently, Kerry's campaign advisor Bob Shrum later stated in Time magazine that Kerry said he wished he'd never picked Edwards, and the two have since stopped speaking to each other. Edwards stated in his concession speech that "You can be disappointed, but you cannot walk away. This fight has just begun."

References

Edwards
John Edwards